Robert James Hollister (born 15 May 1960) is an English country music singer-songwriter and former representative for the now-defunct CMT Europe (1995–1997).

Biography
Bob James was born in Uxbridge, Middlesex, England. In 1998, James was involved with Bradley Varecha's "Don't Let the Home Farm Die" for Farm Bureau. The song aired as a music video on Thanksgiving morning 1998 on U.S. Farm Report.

James is involved with the British campaign, "Save the Great British Pub", through a new song called "What Can We Do Now".

References

External links
Bob James Official Site
Save the Great British Pub

1960 births
Living people
English country singer-songwriters